Reticuline is a chemical compound found in a variety of plants including Lindera aggregata, Annona squamosa, and Ocotea fasciculata (also known as Ocotea duckei). It is based on the benzylisoquinoline structure.

Reticuline is one of the alkaloids found in opium, and experiments in rodents suggest it possesses potent central nervous system depressing effects. It is the precursor of morphine and many other alkaloids. It is also toxic to dopaminergic neurons causing a form of atypical parkinsonism known as Guadeloupean Parkinsonism.

Metabolism 
3'-hydroxy-N-methyl-(S)-coclaurine 4'-O-methyltransferase uses S-adenosyl methionine and 3'-hydroxy-N-methyl-(S)-coclaurine to produce S-adenosylhomocysteine and (S)-reticuline.

Reticuline oxidase uses (S)-reticuline and O2 to produce (S)-scoulerine and H2O2.

Salutaridine synthase uses (R)-reticuline, NADPH, H+, and O2 to produce salutaridine, NADP+, and H2O. Salutaridine can then be transformed progressively to thebaine, oripavine, and morphine.

1,2-dehydroreticulinium reductase (NADPH) uses (R)-reticuline and NADP+ to produce 1,2-dehydroreticulinium, NADPH, and H+.

References

External links

Natural opium alkaloids
Phenols
Phenol ethers
Tetrahydroisoquinolines